RisingOn (ライジングオン) is a mixed martial arts organization promoted by Versus.Co.,Ltd., a Japanese private company. Atsushi Tanabe serves as the manager of Versus. Events are generally held in the Kansai (West Japan) area.

History

Powergate
Versus.Co., Ltd. was established in 2005 to find talented fighters in the West Japan area (Kansai). They held their first event, "POWERGATE The Unknowns Strike Back", on June 19, 2005 at Flamingo the Arusha in Osaka.

Since September 2006, some events featured the use of a hexagonal cage, as well as prohibiting strikes to the head of a downed opponent. Additionally, kickboxing matches were also featured.

Kaiser championships
In 2008, Versus.Co.,Ltd. announced that they would hold tournaments to sanction the first champions at lightweight (70 kg) and middleweight (83 kg). The tournament was named the "Kaiser Grand Prix", and champions were called "Kaiser" in reference to the German word for emperor. On April 13 and June 22, Keisuke Sakai and Zenta Yamazaki won the middleweight and lightweight tournaments to become the inaugural champions in their respective divisions.

On March 17, 2007, Versus.Co.,Ltd. announced that they would promote the featherweight tournament to sanction the first champion at 65 kg. On August 25, Daikai Ozaki won the tournament to become the first featherweight champion. Ozaki defended his title 4 times and retained it until PowerGate closed.

In December 2009, Versus.Co.,Ltd announced to finish the series of PowerGate events and to start the new event series. It was named "RisingOn", and the first event was held on December 29, 2009. From this event, the octagon cage is used. Hiroshi Shiba who won the lightweight title on June 28, 2009 and Daikai Ozaki who won the featherweight title on August 25, 2007 were sanctioned as the first champion of RisingOn.

On August 8, 2010, Hiroki Tanaka became the first champion of RisingOn at welterweight, and from Soo-Chol Kim from South Korea became the third champion at featherweight as the first non-Japanese fighter.

List of events

PowerGate

Weight division system and champions

PowerGate
PowerGate used its original weight division system as follows, but this is not used anymore. The champions were called "Kaiser".

 #1

 #2

Rules

PowerGate

Rounds
Bouts take 3 rounds and each round takes 3 minutes. Intervals of rounds take 1 minute.

Place
Bouts are done on the square ring which has sides of 4 meters or the hexagonal ring which has a diameter of 6 meters.

Attire
Fighters must wear tights, leggings, or kickboxing shorts.　They can be both of short or long. No shoes.

Fouls
Passive actions, Headbutts, Elbow strikes, Knee strikes without knee-pads, Hitting to opponent's head on the ground position, Stomping, Buster, Knee strikes to the opponents on the ground.

Rounds
A bout take 2 rounds and each round takes 5 minutes, but championships take 3 rounds.

Place
Bout are done in the octagon cage.

Attire
Fighters must wear short tights, short leggings or kickboxing shorts.

Fouls
Passive actions, Headbutts, Elbow strikes, Knee strikes without knee-pads, Hitting to opponent's head on the ground position, Stomping, Buster, Knee strikes to the opponents on the ground.

References

External links

RisingOn event results at Sherdog

Organizations established in 2005
Mixed martial arts organizations
Sports organizations of Japan